John Cuffe, 1st Baron Desart (died 26 June 1749) was an Anglo-Irish politician and peer.

He was the son of Agmondesham Cuffe and his wife, Anne Otway. He was educated at Trinity College, Dublin.  In 1708 he was High Sheriff of County Kilkenny. He served in the Irish House of Commons as the Member of Parliament for Thomastown between 1715 and 1727. On 10 November 1733 he was raised to the Peerage of Ireland as Baron Desart, of Desart in the County of Kilkenny, and assumed his seat in the Irish House of Lords.

He was succeeded in his title by his eldest son from his second marriage, John Cuffe. His second son, Otway Cuffe, was made Earl of Desart in 1793.

References

Year of birth unknown
1749 deaths
Alumni of Trinity College Dublin
18th-century Anglo-Irish people
Barons in the Peerage of Ireland
Peers of Ireland created by George II
Irish MPs 1715–1727
High Sheriffs of County Kilkenny
Mayors of Kilkenny
Members of the Irish House of Lords
Members of the Parliament of Ireland (pre-1801) for County Kilkenny constituencies